Blanche Sarah Upright (née Caro; February 22, 1880 - April 3, 1948) was a writer in the United States. Her novel Valley of Content was adapted to film as Pleasure Mad in 1923 and staged in 1925. She appeared in the 1927 film Your Wife and Mine.

Born Blanche Sarah Caro, she married Louis Childs Upright. They owned the fabric business Caro & Upright at 717 Market Street in San Francisco. It also had an office in Los Angeles.

Works
The Valley of Content
The Losing Gain
The Altar of Friendship
The Party of the Third

Filmography
Pleasure Mad (1923), an adaptation of her novel The Valley of Content
Your Wife and Mine (1927) as Mrs. Coy

References

External links
Findagrave entry

1880 births
1949 deaths